Claudia Meier is a paralympic athlete from Germany competing mainly in category T12 middle-distance events.

Claudia has competed at 3 Paralympics and won nine silver medals indistances ranging from 400m to 5000m.  For all bar one of those silvers she finished behind Russian Rima Batalova.

References

Paralympic athletes of Germany
Athletes (track and field) at the 1992 Summer Paralympics
Athletes (track and field) at the 1996 Summer Paralympics
Athletes (track and field) at the 2000 Summer Paralympics
Paralympic silver medalists for Germany
Living people
Medalists at the 1992 Summer Paralympics
Medalists at the 1996 Summer Paralympics
Medalists at the 2000 Summer Paralympics
Year of birth missing (living people)
Paralympic medalists in athletics (track and field)
German female middle-distance runners
Visually impaired middle-distance runners
Paralympic middle-distance runners
20th-century German women